Events in the year 1975 in Germany.

Incumbents
President – Walter Scheel 
Chancellor – Helmut Schmidt

Events

 25 February – German Constitutional Court abortion decision
 27 February – The 2 June Movement kidnaps West German politician Peter Lorenz. He is released on March 4 after most of the kidnappers' demands are met.
 27 June–8 July – 25th Berlin International Film Festival
 August: Fire on the Lüneburg Heath
 Date unknown
German company Coppenrath & Wiese was founded.
Launch of the Volkswagen Polo, a three-door hatchback which fits into the Volkswagen range below the Golf and is similar in size and concept to the Renault 5 from France.
The Flick affair begins with a share trade where the Flick company sold shares worth 1.9 Billion Deutsche Mark from Daimler AG to the Deutsche Bank.

Births
13 February – Sabine Bätzing-Lichtenthäler, German politician
21 February – Daniel Fehlow, German actor
26 February – Frank Busemann, German decathlete
3 March – Johanna Wokalek, German actress
13 April – Lou Bega, German singer
7 May – Michael Kretschmer, German politician
4 June – Radost Bokel, German actress
23 June – Prince Daniel of Saxony, German nobleman
30 June – Ralf Schumacher, German racing driver
2 July –Maxim Mehmet, German actor 
26 July – Ingo Schultz, German athlete
22 September – Christian Ulmen, German entertainer and actor
19 October – Hilde Gerg, German ski alpine skier
 undated - Christoph Bach, German actor

Deaths

11 January – Roma Bahn, German actress (born 1896)
24 January – Erich Kempka, chauffeur of Adolf Hitler (born 1910)
2 February – Karl Maron, German politician (born 1903)
3 March – Therese Giehse, actress (born 1898)
22 March – Paul Verhoeven, actor, theatre and film director (born 1901)
1 April – Lorenz Jaeger, German cardinal of Roman Catholic Church (born 1892)
17 April – Philipp Albrecht, Duke of Württemberg, nobleman (born 1893)
17 June – Max Barthel, writer (born 1893)
6 July – Margret Boveri, journalist and writer (born 1900)
12 August – Werner Rittberger, figure skater (born 1891)
30 October – Gustav Ludwig Hertz, physicist, Nobel Prize laureate (born 1887)
26 November – Anton Storch, politician (born 1892)
16 December – Wilhelm Stählin, German Lutheran theologian, bishop, preacher (born 1883)

See also
 1975 in German television

References

 
Years of the 20th century in Germany
1970s in Germany
Germany
Germany